Huambo District is one of twenty districts of the province Caylloma in Peru.

References

Districts of the Caylloma Province
Districts of the Arequipa Region